"My Heart Cries for You" is a popular song, adapted by Carl Sigman and Percy Faith from an 18th-century French melody. The song has been recorded by many singers, the most successful of which was recorded by Guy Mitchell which reached No. 2 on the Billboard charts in 1951.

Background
The music is based on an old French song believed to date from the time of Louis XVI and Marie Antoinette, "La jardinière du Roi" ("The King's Gardener"), also titled "Chanson de Marie Antoinette" (Marie Antoinette's song) as the music was said to have been written by Marie Antoinette. The French song was published in the US in 1927, and recorded by Lily Pons in 1938. 

In 1950, Percy Faith (using the alias Peter Mars) adapted the music of the song with Carl Sigman writing new English lyrics for the song.  The lyrics of this version, "My heart cries for you, Sighs for you, dies for you..." are original and unrelated to the French song. The song was written in three-quarter waltz time.

Guy Mitchell recording
The song was recorded in November 1950 by Guy Mitchell with Mitch Miller and his orchestra. Mitch Miller originally had intended the sentimental ballad to be recorded by Frank Sinatra, however, Sinatra was not interested in the songs chosen for him when he arrived the day the recording was scheduled, and said: "I'm not doing any of that crap".  Miller, who had already booked the musicians for the recording session, then looked for a replacement to record the song, and invited a new singer that he liked, Al Cernic, to come to the studio that evening. The recording went well, and Miller then told Cernic that he should change his name as Miller could not pronounce it. Cernic, initially reluctant, then became Guy Mitchell for the record release. 

The song was released with "The Roving Kind" as its B-side in November 1950 by Columbia Records (catalog number 39067). It became Mitchell's first hit song, reaching number 2 for seven weeks on the Billboard chart in 1951 with over a million copies sold. It was number 1 on Your Hit Parade for two weeks, and number 1 on Cash Box for six weeks.

Mitchell released another version of the song in 1958.

Charts

Other recordings

Early versions
Many versions of the song were recorded and released in the late 1950 and early 1951. A version was first recorded by Dinah Shore with Henri René's Orchestra & Chorus in New York City, and released around the same time as Guy Mitchell. (RCA Victor Records catalog number 20-3978 in the US dated October 29, 1950, and EMI on the His Master's Voice in the UK, catalog number B 10026.) It reached number 3 on Billboard'''s pop chart. 

Numerous cover versions by other artists quickly followed, including Vic Damone (a number 4 hit on the Billboard chart), Jimmy Wakely (number 12 on pop and number 7 on country), Bill Farrell (number 18), Al Morgan (number 24), Evelyn Knight and Red Foley, a duet which reached number 28 pop and number 6 country, and Victor Young and His Singing Strings (number 29 on pop). 

Other versions

The composition was also arranged and recorded by John Serry, Sr. and his ensemble for Dot Records as a 33 RPM vinyl recording entitled Squeeze Play in 1956. Subsequently, it was released by Versailles Records as a 45 RPM recording under the title Chicago Musette - John Serry et son Accordéon in 1958.
A revival by Ray Charles reached the U.S. top forty in 1964.
Connie Francis "bubbled under" the Billboard pop chart in 1967 (number 118) and peaked at number 12 on Billboard Adult Contemporary. She also recorded the song in German as "Mein Herz ruft nach dir" and in French as "Mon cœur pleure pour vous", the latter marking her last French-language recording of the 1960s.
Percy Faith himself recorded an instrumental version of this song in the early 1970s.  It is on his 1973 album, Corazón.
On his 2005 "comeback" album, The Moon Was Blue, country singer Bobby Bare also recorded a version of the song.
On her 2006 album If Your Memory Serves You Well, Serena Ryder covers this, as well as many other classics. The album received Gold certification.
Harry James released a version in 1981 on his album For Listening And Dancing (Reader's Digest RD4A 213)
Margo Smith released a version in 1981 that peaked at number 72 on the Billboard'' Hot Country Singles chart.

References

1950 songs
1967 singles
Songs written by Carl Sigman
Vic Damone songs
Guy Mitchell songs
Connie Francis songs
Evelyn Knight songs
Red Foley songs
Jimmy Wakely songs
Margo Smith songs
1950s ballads